Luke Wilton (fl. 1410–1413), of Wells, Somerset, was an English politician.

Family
Wilton married Agnes, the widow of another MP for Wells, Richard Groos.

Career
He was a Member (MP) of the Parliament of England for Wells in 1410 and May 1413.

References

14th-century births
15th-century deaths
English MPs 1410
People from Wells, Somerset
English MPs May 1413